OAB may stand for:
 Order of Attorneys of Brazil (Ordem dos Advogados do Brasil), the Brazilian Bar Association
 The Oxford Annotated Bible
 Oita Asahi Broadcasting, a television company in Japan
 Oman Arab Bank, a bank in Oman
 Overactive bladder, a urological syndrome
 Oriental Air Bridge, airline